The Sorbonne-Nouvelle University (also known as Paris-III) is a public university in Paris, France. It is one of the inheritors of the historic University of Paris, which was completely overhauled and restructured in 1970. Paris III offers courses in a wide range of Arts and Humanities subjects, areas in which – according to the 2018 QS World University Rankings – the university is the 71st best worldwide.

History

The historic University of Paris first appeared in the second half of the 12th century, but was reorganised in 1970 as 13 autonomous universities after the student protests of the French May. Sorbonne Nouvelle, or "Paris III", is one of the inheritors of University of Paris faculty of humanities ("arts et lettres").

University sites

The Sorbonne-Nouvelle has sites at various locations in Paris. The main university centres are:

Central Sorbonne Building — central administration offices, Literature 

Nation – the main teaching site, named after the arrondissement (since 2022) 

Bièvre — houses teaching and research facilities for language study and the main staff and student refectories

Rue Saint-Jacques — French as a Foreign Language

Rue des Bernardins — Linguistics and Phonetics

Rue de l'École-de-Médecine — English Studies 

Rue Saint-Guillaume — Latin American Studies

Place du Maréchal-de-Lattre-de-Tassigny — Houses the E.S.I.T (School of Interpreting and Translation)

Asnières – located outside of Paris, where the German Studies department, now closed, was housed.

In 2022, the Censier Campus, located on rue Censier, was abandoned.

University libraries

The Sorbonne Nouvelle has one central and five specialised libraries (Foreign language and culture and French literature).  It is also connected to the Library of Saint Genevieve, the Central Sorbonne Library, the Inter-University Library for Oriental Languages and the Library of Saint Barbara.

University press
The Presses Sorbonne-Nouvelle publishes research carried out by the university.

Accommodation and refectories
The CROUS de Paris (Centre régional des œuvres universitaires et scolaires) is the organisation responsible for both student accommodation and refectories in Paris. It runs various student halls of residence and student restaurants both in central Paris and in its outskirts.

Sorbonne Paris Cité Alliance

Sorbonne-Nouvelle University tried to become a member of Sorbonne Paris Cité Alliance,  which groups together several Parisian universities. Due to opposition from students and professors, the project did not succeed.

Notable alumni
 Alan García - President of Peru
 Olivier Assayas - French film director and screenwriter
 Jacques Aumont - Film Professor
 Latifa Ben Mansour - Algerian writer and linguist
 Alain Bergala - French film director
 Jean Bessière - Academic and writer
 Frédéric Bozo - Academic
 Bruno della Chiesa -  Linguist
 Arnaud Desplechin - French film director
Mike Downey, Film producer
 Cédric Klapisch - French Film Director (L'Auberge Espagnole, Les poupées russes, Paris)
 Bernard-Pierre Donnadieu - French actor
 Olivier Ducastel - French film director
 Mireille Guiliano - French-American author
 René Gutman: Ph.D., a former philosophy student, Rabbi of Strasbourg
 Martine L. Jacquot - writer, journalist
 Miro Kovač - Croatian Foreign Minister 
 Hüseyin Latif - Novelist and Aujourd'hui la Turquie's Director of publication
 Sarah Lelouch - Daughter of Claude Lelouch
 Laila Marrakchi - French film director
 Predrag Matvejevic - Writer and academic
 Imanol Ordorika Sacristán - Mexican social activist
 Sigurður Pálsson - Icelandic author
 Pedro Paulet - Peruvian scientist
 Homa Sayar - Iranian Poet
 Jean-Pierre Thiollet - French author
 Patricia de Souza - Peruvian writer
 Maryse Condé - French (Guadeloupean) novelist

Professors and former professors

 Henri Adamczewski
 Jacques Aumont
 Louis Bazin
 Raymond Bellour
 Alain Bergala
 Jean Bessière
 Pascal Bonitzer
 Frédéric Bozo
 Linda Cardinal
 Michel Chion
 Serge Daney
 Latifa Ben Mansour
 Michel Marie
 Stéphane Michaud
 Luc Moullet
 Annie Ousset-Krief
 Maria Isaura Pereira de Queiróz
 Josette Rey-Debove
 Jean-Pierre Sarrazac
 Danica Seleskovitch

See also 
 Education in France
 University of Paris
 Sorbonne (disambiguation)

References

External links 
 Research site of the Sorbonne Nouvelle
 Forum de Paris 3, news by and for Censier students
 Presses Sorbonne Nouvelle
 CROUS de Paris

Educational institutions established in 1971
1971 establishments in France
University presses of France
Universities in Île-de-France
Universities descended from the University of Paris